Anthony Nelson Keys (13 November 1911 – 19 March 1985) was a British film producer, best known of his work with Hammer Film Productions. His father was Nelson Keys and his brother John Paddy Carstairs.

Select filmography
The Curse of Frankenstein (1957)
Quatermass 2 (1957)
The Steel Bayonet (1957)
Horror of Dracula (1958)
The Revenge of Frankenstein (1958)
The Pirates of Blood River (1961) *The Devil Ship Pirates (1964)
The Devil Rides Out (1967)

References

External links

1911 births
1985 deaths
British film producers
20th-century British businesspeople